Onchidella borealis is a species of air-breathing sea slug, a shell-less marine pulmonate gastropod mollusk in the family Onchidiidae.

Distribution

Description
A small sea slug about 1/2-inch long varying in colors from orange to a dark brown.
The most identifying feature is the wavy sides of the sea slug.

Where to find
Mostly found on low tides, Onchidella borealis is a fairly hard organism to find.

References

External links

Onchidiidae
Gastropods described in 1872